We Don't Bite: Villains in the Countryside is a South Korea reality show program on tvN with Um Ki-joon, Yoon Jong-hoon and Bong Tae-gyu as the main cast members. The show airs on tvN every Tuesday at 20:40 (KST) starting from September 28, 2021. It also airs on tvN Asia starting from October 11, 2021 and subsequently on every Monday at 22:30 (UTC+08:00).

Synopsis 
The 3 cast members spend their rest times in a deserted house located at a countryside. During their stay, they will be revamping the house to make it more hospitable for them to stay and to host their guests. They will also be welcoming various guests (mostly the actors and actresses who've the cast members worked together with in the popular drama series The Penthouse: War in Life) whom they thank for.

Episodes

2021

Ratings 
 Ratings listed below are the individual corner ratings of We Don't Bite: Villains in the Countryside. (Note: Individual corner ratings do not include commercial time, which regular ratings include.)

2021

References

External links 
  

South Korean reality television series
2021 South Korean television series debuts
Korean-language television shows
South Korean television shows
South Korean variety television shows